Mark Anthony Eckman (born February 9, 1959) is an American prelate of the Roman Catholic Church who has been serving as auxiliary bishop for the Diocese of Pittsburgh in Pennsylvania since 2022.

Biography
Mark Eckman was born on February 9, 1959, in Pittsburgh, Pennsylvania. On May 11, 1985, Eckman was ordained to the priesthood for the Diocese of Pittsburgh by then Archbishop Anthony Bevilacqua. 

Pope Francis appointed Eckman as an auxiliary bishop for the Diocese of Pittsburgh on November 5, 2021.  On January 11, 2022, Eckman was consecrated by Bishop David Zubik.

See also

 Catholic Church hierarchy
 Catholic Church in the United States
 Historical list of the Catholic bishops of the United States
 List of Catholic bishops of the United States
 Lists of patriarchs, archbishops, and bishops

References

External links
Roman Catholic Diocese of Pittsburgh Official Site

Episcopal succession

 

1959 births
Living people
American Roman Catholic bishops
Bishops appointed by Pope Francis
Religious leaders from Pittsburgh